The Lynx Formation or Lynx Group is a stratigraphic unit of Late Cambrian (Dresbachian) age in the Western Canada Sedimentary Basin. It is present in the Canadian Rockies of Alberta and British Columbia. It was originally described as the Lynx Formation by Charles Doolittle Walcott in 1913, based on and named for outcrops on the slopes of Lynx Mountain on the continental divide east of Mount Robson. It was subdivided into five formations and elevated to group status by J.D. Aitken and R.G. Greggs in 1967. The name Lynx Formation continues to be used in areas where some or all of the subdivisions cannot be distinguished. All of the formations in the Lynx Group include fossil trilobites and some contain the stromatolite Collenia.

Lithology and deposition
The Lynx Group is composed alternating zones of carbonate rocks, most of which are dolomitic, and shales.
It was deposited in shallow marine environments along the western margin of the North American Craton during Late Cambrian time. In many areas it is subdivided into the five formations listed below.

Subdivisions
Upper Lynx Group

Lower Lynx Group

Distribution
The Lynx Group is present in the Canadian Rockies of Alberta and British Columbia. It is typically between 1068-1220 metres (3500-400 feet) thick in the front and main ranges. It extends as far north as the Monkman Pass area of British Columbia.

Relationship to other units
The Lynx Group overlies the Arctomys Formation and the contact is gradational. It is overlain by the Survey Peak Formation and the contact is concordant but abrupt.

References

Cambrian Alberta
Stratigraphy of British Columbia
Cambrian southern paleotropical deposits
Cambrian System of North America
Western Canadian Sedimentary Basin
Geologic formations of Alberta
Geologic formations of Canada